Victoria General Hospital is a general hospital in Winnipeg, Manitoba, Canada founded in 1911. Originally it was located at 424 River Ave. in Osborne Village. Construction tenders were issued in July 1968 for a 7-storey, 250-bed facility. In January 1971 it moved to its present location, 2340 Pembina Hwy., in Fort Richmond beside the University of Manitoba.

Today, it is a community hospital with 231 beds and employs more than 1,200 people.

External links
 Victoria General Hospital, Winnipeg, Manitoba
Victoria General Hospital Foundation

References

Hospitals in Winnipeg
Hospital buildings completed in 1971
Hospitals established in 1911
1911 establishments in Manitoba